Carlia nigrauris is a species of skink in the genus Carlia. It is native to Indonesia and is distinguished from other members of the Carlia genus by its black coloration and relatively larger size.

References

Carlia
Reptiles described in 2010
Endemic fauna of Indonesia
Reptiles of Indonesia
Taxa named by George Robert Zug